Entente de Sour El Ghozlane, known as E Sour El Ghozlane or simply ESG for short, is an Algerian football club based in Sour El-Ghozlane in Bouïra Province. The club was founded in 1912 and its colours are blue and white. Their home stadium, Mohamed Derradji Stadium, has a capacity of 5,000 spectators. The club is currently playing in the Algerian Ligue 2.

History
The club came eighth in the 2009–10 Ligue Inter-Régions de football – Groupe Centre.

The club was promoted for the 2010–11 season of the newly created Championnat National de Football Amateur due to the professionalisation of the first two divisions in Algeria.

On May 28, 2022, E Sour El Ghozlane promoted to the Algerian Ligue 2.

References

External links

Football clubs in Algeria
Bouïra Province
Association football clubs established in 1912
1912 establishments in Algeria
Sports clubs in Algeria